It Takes People Like You to Make People Like Me (or simply It Takes People Like You) is an album by Buck Owens and his Buckaroos, released in 1968.

It was re-released on CD in 1997 by Sundazed Records with two bonus tracks, including the mono single version of the title track.

Reception

In his Allmusic review, critic Cub Koda wrote "By this time, Owens had found his groove, crafting one fine single after another, making each new album almost seem like a greatest-hits collection, even if every song wasn't actually a chart number."

Track listing
All songs by Buck Owens unless otherwise noted.
 "It Takes People Like You (To Make People Like Me)" – 2:01
 "The Way That I Love You" – 2:35
 "We Were Made for Each Other" – 2:17
 "That's How I Measure My Love for You" (Owens, Don Rich) – 2:41
 "If I Knew" (Ed King, Owens) – 2:33
 "I'm Gonna Live It Up" (Owens, Rich) – 2:13
 "Where Does the Good Times Go" – 2:18
 "You Left Her Lonely Too Long" – 2:55
 "Let the World Keep on a Turnin'" – 2:06
 "I've Got It Bad for You" (Owens, Rich) – 2:01
 "Long, Long Ago" – 2:12
 "Heartbreak Mountain" – 2:09
1995 bonus tracks:
 "It Takes People Like You (To Make People Like Me)" – 2:01
 "Where Does the Good Times Go" – 2:17

Personnel
Buck Owens – vocals, guitar, harmony vocals
Don Rich – guitar, fiddle, harmony vocals, National Steel guitar
Doyle Holly – guitar, bass
Tom Brumley – pedal steel guitar
Jimmy Bryant – guitar
Willie Cantu – drums, tambourine
Bert Dodson – guitar, bass
Donald Frost – bass
Bob Morris – bass
Jelly Sanders – guitar, fiddle
Wayne Wilson – guitar

References

External links
Reissue review at No Depression magazine.

1968 albums
Buck Owens albums
Capitol Records albums
Albums produced by Ken Nelson (United States record producer)

Albums recorded at Capitol Studios